Timothy Quiller Rowett (born 12 July 1942) is a British YouTube personality and renowned toy collector, known for presenting videos about toys, optical illusions, novelties and puzzles on the YouTube channel Grand Illusions. Rowett, known affectionately as "Tim the Toyman", is a former children's entertainer, and claims to have collected upwards of 20,000 to 25,000 toys over a 50-year period, many of which are featured in his videos.

In 2014, the Daily Mirror described Rowett as a "huge viral hit" and a "web sensation", while in the following year The Daily Telegraph published a piece naming him as one of "the best YouTubers over 50".

Career 
Rowett worked as an entertainer at children's parties from his late 20s until retiring in 2007 when he was 65. In a short BBC documentary, Rowett said that he considered the toys in his suitcases "dead" because they were no longer used, and that he took "great delight" in being able to bring them out and show them to people through his YouTube videos. In the past he has also donated some of his old toys to children's hospitals. He has a degree in Mechanical Engineering.

Grand Illusions 
Rowett has presented videos on the YouTube channel Grand Illusions since 2008. In each video, he lightheartedly demonstrates and reacts to at least one toy, puzzle, or optical illusion which is either part of his collection or will be stocked through an online toy store, run as part of the Grand Illusions brand (to which he is a director). There are now several hundred videos on the channel which are around 10 minutes in length each, and have collectively been viewed hundreds of millions of times. The channel surpassed one million subscribers in June 2019 and was awarded a golden YouTube Play Button, which Rowett unboxed in a video.

Grand Illusions was started as an online community for science and games in 1996. It was developed by Hendrik Ball and George Auckland (then BBC producers) who were exploring the role of the media and the World Wide Web during the late 90s. Rowett became involved early on due to his large toy collection, and is a personal friend of Auckland and Ball. Grand Illusions became an online store for toys and novelties in 1998, stocking hard-to-source pieces. Since the success of the Grand Illusions YouTube channel, and the attention it has received on websites like Reddit, the store has commissioned new toys and also stocks unique items that are handmade or produced in small quantities.

The videos for Grand Illusions are filmed in a 17th-century farm house in rural Oxfordshire. Each one is developed by Ball and Auckland (both now retired from the BBC). The Grand Illusions online store is run from Oxfordshire although the items are now sent out by a fulfilment house in Newbury.

Other work 
Rowett appeared on the television science programme Take Nobody’s Word For It in 1989 alongside Carol Vorderman, demonstrating optical illusions.

Rowett has been cited and thanked in a number of books as a toy collector and consultant. Rowett has also contributed his own writing and poetry to books in the past, first publishing a piece in the 1999 edition of The Mathemagician and Pied Puzzler : a Collection in Tribute to Martin Gardner, and again in 2001 with a piece in Puzzlers' Tribute: A Feast for the Mind.

Personal life 
Rowett lives by himself at his Twickenham home in England, and claims to have not owned a television or computer since the 1970s (however in January 2017 he acquired a model Televisor for his collection). He has been described as an "eccentric" and "quirky" collector and first became interested in toys while attending boarding school as a child, allegedly when a matron showed him a catalogue featuring a variety of toys. Aside from this, he also has an interest in engineering and mechanics.

In a 2014 interview with Wired UK, Rowett reflected on his age, stating "I see myself as an hourglass. A large part of me is 112, a small part is my physical age and the last part is a 12-year-old boy."

Rowett claimed that his home was burgled sometime around the 1980s, but the toy collection was untouched, leaving him feeling "obviously relieved" but "offended they hadn’t valued the toys enough to pinch them".

Toy collection 
Among Rowett's first toys as a child included a novelty wheelbarrow and a squeaking panda teddy bear.

Journalists who visited Rowett's home noted that his collection, which spans over 50 years and contains an estimated 25,000 pieces, takes up a large amount of space. It was reported there were over 180 suitcases which are neatly ordered by year, and most of his walls and bookshelves are filled with items, including novelty clocks and display cabinets with optical illusions.

Hendrik Ball, a former BBC producer who works with Rowett to develop the Grand Illusions videos, said that Rowett will carry around toys and equipment with him and give demonstrations "whenever there is a lull". After a meal at a restaurant, he allegedly went outside and inflated a large balloon using a helium cylinder stored in the boot of his car, then lit and attached a sparkler before releasing it into the air.

Family 
Rowett was born during World War II to father William Berkeley Rowett, an ordained priest, and mother Elizabeth Chidell, who were married on 9 October 1934. He has four brothers. Rowett has distant relatives in Canada, and his family tree has immediate connections to the country.

In 1968, his elder brother David, who had moved to Canada, died at the age of 27.

Awards

References 

1942 births
Living people
British collectors
Toy collectors
People from Surrey (before 1965)
English YouTubers